Arizona has been affected by hurricanes on numerous occasions. Usually, these storms originate in the eastern Pacific Ocean, make landfall in the Mexican states of Baja California or Sonora, and dissipate before crossing into the United States. Thus, in most cases, it is only the tropical cyclones' remnant moisture that produces heavy rainfall—and in some occasions, flooding—in portions of Arizona. However, approximately every five years, a tropical cyclone retains sufficient strength to enter the state as a tropical storm or a tropical depression. Arizonans can expect indirect flash floods caused by the remnants of tropical cyclones to occur about every two years.

Tropical cyclones in Arizona are not common, since the predominant wind pattern steers most storms that form in the Eastern Pacific either parallel or away from the Pacific coast of northwestern Mexico. As a result, most storms that could affect Arizona are carried away from the United States, with only 6% of all Pacific hurricanes entering US territory. Not all Arizona hurricanes originate from the Pacific Ocean, however; in July 2008 an Atlantic hurricane named Hurricane Dolly produced rainfall in the eastern portion of the state, and another Atlantic storm reached Arizona as a tropical depression. Many, but not all, of these systems also impacted California.

Despite their rarity, hurricanes are among Arizona's most significant weather makers. In years when Arizona is affected by a tropical cyclone, these can be responsible for up to 25% of the rainfall in areas along the Colorado River. Arizona hurricanes are also responsible for torrential rains in localized areas, with the state's 24-hour rainfall record— of precipitation—occurring during Hurricane Nora's landfall in 1997. The heavy rainfall can trigger extensive flash floods, such as the ones produced by the remnants of Tropical Storm Octave in 1983, or the lingering moisture from Tropical Storm Emilia in 2006.

Climatology

Tropical cyclones are not common over Arizona, but on average, a tropical storm or a tropical depression enters the state approximately every five years. However, indirect flash floods caused by the remnants of tropical cyclones are more common, as they tend to occur about every two years.

Storms that approach the southwestern United States, and by extension Arizona, generally form closer to the Mexican shoreline than average, making them more likely to recurve northwards under the influence of an approaching trough. These troughs tend to extend farther to the south during the latter part of the Pacific hurricane season, in the period between late August and early October. These pronounced troughs thus produce a synoptic-scale flow that is conducive to steering hurricanes towards the southwestern United States.

The infusions of tropical moisture from Arizona-bound tropical cyclones can be a significant portion of the rainfall in the region. In years when hurricanes approach Arizona, eastern and northern portions of the state receive on average 6–8% of the monsoon-season precipitation from tropical systems and their remnants. This percentage rises towards the southwestern corner of the state, which can receive up to a quarter of its monsoon-season rainfall from tropical cyclones.

Storms
Tropical storms are one of Arizona's main sources of rainfall, as they infuse the monsoon over the southwestern United States with moisture, producing large-scale floods in occasions. However, all of the storms that have impacted Arizona have formed in the latter parts of the Pacific hurricane season, and only storm remnants have affected the state before August.

Storm systems

Several of these tropical cyclones have caused deaths or heavy property damage, usually due to flooding caused by rain.

Before 1960
Records of tropical cyclones in the East Pacific before 1950 are sparse, but there were still several storms that produced rainfall over Arizona in this period.
August 1921:  The first known tropical disturbance to affect the state occurred when a remnant low of a tropical cyclone moved into the western portions of the state.
 September 1921: A tropical depression that had tracked parallel to the Mexican coastline moved into Arizona, causing heavy rainfall on September 30.
 September 1926: Five years later, the remnants of another September storm hit the state, but this time the precipitation was heaviest on the southeastern portion of the state.
 September 1927: The remnants of another tropical system caused  of rainfall throughout the state.
 June 1929: The Atlantic hurricane reanalysis project discovered that a rare Atlantic hurricane reached the eastern part of the state as a tropical depression.  Damage from this storm, if any, is unknown.
 August 1935: The remnants of an unnamed tropical storm that landed on Southern California caused torrential rain and flooding across Arizona, especially along the Santa Cruz River and Rillito Creek on Southern Arizona.
 September 1939: Two tropical systems entered the state during the month. On September 4, the remnants of a former hurricane entered southwest Arizona, near Yuma. This same system produced more than twice the average annual rainfall in Imperial Valley, California. On the 11th, the remnants of a separate system also passed over southwest Arizona.
August 1951: No tropical cyclones are known to have affected Arizona in the 1940s. However, in the 1950s, the remnants of two more storms affected the state. Flagstaff saw  of rain, with similar totals measured at Prescott and Phoenix. The storm also washed out several roadways near Gila Bend, isolating the city from motorists. Overall, the storm caused $750,000 (1951 USD) in property damage.
July 1954: Three years later, the remnants of another hurricane moved over Arizona from the south during the month of July. Damage from this storm is unknown.

1960s
Over  of rainfall also fell near the Arizona-Sonora Desert Museum. Flooding from the storm inundated the towns of Marana and Sells, both in Pima County. Total damage in Pima and Pinal Counties exceeded $11 million (1962 USD).
 September 1964: The next storm to affect the state was Tropical Storm Tillie in 1964. Although the storm remained at sea, its residual moisture was advected over southern Arizona, allowing a passing cold front to trigger widespread showers and thunderstorms on the evening of September 9. Tucson received  of rainfall in a 24-hour period between September 9–10, and two locations—one in the Catalina Mountain foothills and one near Sahuarita—recorded  of precipitation. Coupled with rain during the previous week, the Santa Cruz River produced heavy runoff, with peak flows of  recorded near Cortaro.
 September 1965: The following year, the remnants of Hurricane Emily crossed into Arizona from Baja California. Any damage from the storm is not known.
 September 1966: The remnants of Kirsten caused  of rainfall in Nogales.
 August 1967: Hurricane Katrina brought heavy rainfall into the southern portion of the state as a tropical depression. The peak recorded rainfall occurred at Wellton, where  were measured between September 1 and 2. Yuma recorded  within a 24-hour period; that was the heaviest rainfall recorded in a four-year period, and was more than the normal rainfall that the city receives during the entire fall season.
 August 1968: Two storms approached Arizona in 1968. The first was Tropical Storm Hyacinth in August. It reached the southeastern corner of the state as a tropical depression, and produced showers and thunderstorms over the eastern portion of the state.
 October 1968: The last storm to impact Arizona during the decade was Hurricane Pauline, which added high amounts of moisture ahead of a cold front in early October. The added instability in the atmosphere allowed the cold front to produce severe thunderstorms, including an F2 tornado that wrecked several homes and caused $250,000 (1968 USD) in damage when it touched down in Glendale.

1970s

September 1970: The remnants of Tropical Storm Norma became Arizona's deadliest storm when they contributed to the disaster known as the "Labor Day storm of 1970". As Norma dissipated, moisture from the cyclone was entrapped in a large extratropical low. Much of the region saw extensive flash flooding that killed 23 people and caused significant damage.
Pinal Ranch reported  of precipitation, while Mount Lemmon measured . Olivia's remnants also caused three major power outages near Yuma and produced flooding that resulted in the closure of a portion of U.S. Route 95. In Navajo and Pinal counties, the rainfall damaged roads, bridges, sewers, and homes, which amounted to about $250,000 in repair work for the state of Arizona.
October 1972: Hurricane Joanne entered Arizona as a tropical storm before dissipating near Flagstaff. The Nogales Highway Bridge over the Santa Cruz River was washed away by the flooding. The heavy rain from Joanne saturated the soils for a later storm that produced flooding that caused $10 million (1972 USD) in property damage and eight deaths.
 September 1976: On September 11, Hurricane Kathleen entered southern California, producing tropical-storm-force winds over western and possibly southern Arizona. The winds from Kathleen killed a man when a gust of wind blew a palm tree down onto his mobile home. Severe flooding and hailstorms also resulted. While most of the rainfall from the storm fell in California,  fell at the Davis Dam on the Colorado River.
 October 1976: The next month, Hurricane Liza brought light rain to the state, with the state maximum being  on Willow Beach.
August 1977: Hurricane Doreen caused severe flooding in Yuma County and near Bullhead City.
 October 1977: The remnants of Hurricane Heather caused  of rain in Nogales. Extensive bank erosion occurred across southeastern Arizona, as rivers crested over their 100-year flood levels, and 400 people were forced to evacuate their homes. Total damage from the storm was assessed at $15 million (1977 USD).

1980s

The 1980s saw destructive tropical cyclones pass through the state, as was the case with the previous decade.
October 1983: A weather system, including moisture from Tropical Storm Octave, caused torrential rains over a ten-day period. The largest precipitation total occurred in Mount Graham, which saw  of rain overall. The downpour caused record floods in the San Francisco, Gila, San Pedro, and Santa Cruz rivers. Fourteen people drowned, 975 were injured, and roughly 10,000 people were left homeless after the flooding ended. The amount of damage from the disaster was put at $370 million (year unknown) USD.
September 1984: Hurricane Norbert entered Arizona as a weakening tropical depression.
October 1989: Flash flooding produced by Hurricane Raymond caused $1.5 million (1989 USD) in damage in the state.

1990s

During the 1990s, several tropical systems affected Arizona even after losing all tropical characteristics. However, two hurricanes survived long enough to reach Arizona while still considered tropical systems.

 June 1990: The moisture from Boris in 1990 produced  of rainfall on the Santa Rita Mountains.
 August 1990: The remnants of Hurricane Diana entered Arizona and quickly dissipated, though no rainfall was report throughout the state.
Damage from the storm in Arizona totaled to $5 million (1995 USD; $  USD).
 September 1995: That same year, Ismael produced most of its damage south of the state, but light rainfall fell over Cochise County, with the highest reported rainfall being .
 September 1997: Hurricane Nora, the second storm to reach the state while still retaining tropical characteristics, struck the state in late September and was responsible for the 24-hour rainfall record in the state. Nora produced  of rainfall over the Harquahala Mountains in Western Arizona, causing some flash flooding in the area. Near Phoenix, rainfall from the storm caused the Narrows Dam, a small earthen dam, to fail; localized rainfall amounts of up to  occurred throughout the state. Nora also caused 12,000 people to lose electric power in Yuma. Nora caused $150–200 million (1997 USD) in agricultural losses in Arizona.
However, there was no flooding reported in the area, and Tucson International Airport reported only  as a result of the storm.

2000s

The last decade saw no storms reach Arizona while retaining tropical characteristics; however, numerous remnant lows caused heavy rainfall and flooding throughout the state.
October 2000: The remnants of the first system, Tropical Storm Olivia, produced heavy flash floods in spite of Olivia losing tropical characteristics while located 600 miles (965 km) west-southwest of Cabo San Lucas, Baja California Sur.
October 2001: Hurricane Juliette dissipated in the Gulf of California, and brought only trace amounts of rainfall to the southern half of the state; the largest amount recorded occurred near Patagonia, where  fell.
 August 2003: Two years later, the remnants of Hurricane Ignacio produced rainfall over southern Arizona. About 40 residences in Catalina were evacuated due to the risk of flash flooding after  of rainfall fell over the Aspen Fire burn area.
 September 2003: That same year, Hurricane Marty brought locally heavy rains to extreme southwestern Arizona in September; in spite of this, there were no reports of flooding from the storm.
 September 2004: Javier produced heavy rain throughout the state, helping to alleviate a prolonged drought in the Southwestern United States. The rain from Javier flooded several roads in the city and, combined with frequent lightning, forced the university to delay one of its football games.
 July 2006: The remnants of Tropical Storm Emilia produced an influx of tropical moisture over Arizona, triggering a week-long period of disturbed weather in late July. The next day, another thunderstorm near Elfrida also produced  hail. After one week of widespread rainfall over southeastern Arizona, extensive flooding began to occur. Other streams in the area also saw record flooding, and the Santa Cruz River exceeded flood stage in Marana. The floods caused $4 million (2006 USD) in damage.
 September 2007: Hurricane Henriette also produced flooding over Cochise County the following year; one woman died after trying to cross a flooded wash near Sierra Vista.
 July 2008: The remnants from Atlantic hurricane Hurricane Dolly caused rainfall in the eastern portion of the state, with  falling southwest of Portal.
The damages at the airport were estimated at $1 million (2008 USD).
 September 2009: The remnants of Hurricane Jimena moved over Arizona on September 5. Near Walapai, water, rock, and other debris covered many roads. In addition, several power lines were down at the Bullhead City Airport. Golf ball-sized hail ( in diameter) fell northwest of Golden Valley; a weather spotter's house received $5,000 in damage, with all of its windows broken and with damage to his weather station and radio equipment. In Riviera, southwest of Bullhead City, seven mobile home trails were blown with many other receiving some damage due to  wind gusts. In the same area, four people were hurt and total damage was $500,000. North of Mohave Valley, mudslides caused two homes to be destroyed, with 9 others receiving moderate damage, and 16 other receiving minimal damage. Total damage was estimated to be at $600,000. In Laveen,  of precipitation fell in a 90-minute period. Heavy rain was recorded in Sedona, thus blocking traffic on State Route 179. in Prescott, street flooding was reported, closing State Route 69 and the Emerald Trail. In Quartzsite, washes overflowed their banks, causing street flooding, and $30,000 in damage. In Tanca,  of precipitation fell within a 30-minute period, thus causing minor flooding with one road being washed out. Damage from that flood totaled $30,000. Yuma also reported  of rain from the cyclone. On the afternoon of September 5, a haystack caught fire due to lighting, and was eventually responsible for an additional $20,000 in damage.

2010s
September 3, 2013: Moisture from the remnants of Tropical Storm Juliette fueled the monsoon across the southwestern United States, producing scattered showers and thunderstorms.
September 8, 2014: The remnants of Hurricane Norbert produced record-breaking rainfall throughout the central portion of the state. Chandler received  of precipitation, while Phoenix Sky Harbor Airport recorded  of rainfall over a seven-hour period, breaking the 75‑year‑old daily rainfall record. It was also the highest precipitation at Sky Harbor in a single calendar day, but fell short of the station's 24‑hour rainfall total. Accumulations in Chandler and Mesa were deemed to be a 1-in-1,000 year event while Phoenix was calculated to be a 1-in-200 year event. Two women died, one in Pinal County and one in Tucson; both were swept away by floodwaters in their vehicles. Total damage in Maricopa and La Paz Counties amounted to $17.4 million.
September 18, 2014: The remnants of Hurricane Odile brought heavy rainfall to southeastern Arizona.
June 5, 2015: The remnants of Hurricane Andres brought thunderstorms to Arizona, with Phoenix having measurable precipitation on that day for the first time since records began in 1896.
June 9, 2015: Just four days after Andres brought record-breaking rain to the Desert Southwest, another low-pressure system containing the remnants of Hurricane Blanca brought more record-breaking rainfall to many Arizona cities, including Tucson and Yuma.
July 18, 2015: Some of Hurricane Dolores's moisture and remnants were directed into Arizona, bringing showers and thunderstorms. Up to 1 inch of rain was recorded in some places. The heavy rain triggered some flash floods and mudslides near Phoenix.
October 1–2, 2018: Hurricane Rosa which at that time was a tropical storm approaching Baja California, left massive rainfall within these two days. More than 2 inches of rain was recorded in some places. Many places were covered with water, some flash floods.

See also

 List of Pacific hurricanes
 Pacific hurricane season
 List of California hurricanes
 List of New Mexico hurricanes
 List of wettest tropical cyclones in the United States

References

 
Lists of tropical cyclones in the United States
 Arizona
Hurr
Atlantic hurricanes